Olivia Sanchez Brown is a multimedia Chicana artist and curator in the Los Angeles area and has been active since the early 1970s.

Art
Olivia Sanchez Brown was one of the first Chicana Artists to be featured in a juried exhibition in The Woman's Building in 1973, around the time that The Woman's Building was first established. And was included in the “Madre Tierra” exhibit in collaboration with several Chicano artists.

References

External links

American artists of Mexican descent
Living people
Year of birth missing (living people)